Edward Diggle (1864–1934) was a leading professional billiard player, known as "The Mechanical Methodical Mancunian".

Diggle was a protégé of John Roberts, Jr., and became his regular practice partner. He is described by cue sports historian Clive Everton as "a languid, wry man with a casual, half upright [playing] style with both legs inelegantly bent." In 1895, Diggle set the record for the break on a standard billiard table when he compiled a 985 against Roberts. Willie Smith credited Diggle's , a method to increase ,as being an integral part of his own style.

References

1864 births
1934 deaths
English players of English billiards